San José City College (SJCC) is a public community college in San Jose, California. Founded in 1921, SJCC is located in the West San Jose neighborhood of Fruitdale.

History

The college was founded in 1921, opening its doors to students in September of that year. SJCC is one of the oldest colleges in the California Community College System.

In 1953, San José Unified School District took over the college's operation in 1953 from San José State University. The college moved to its present location in the Fruitdale neighborhood of West San Jose in the same year.

The college's name changed to "San José City College" in 1958.

In 1999, 2004 and 2010 voters within the San José-Evergreen Community College District passed bond measures to re-build the campus and provide modern technology and facilities for the students, which resulted in the construction of buildings like César E. Chávez Library, the Science Complex, Carmen Castellano Fine Arts Center, and the SJCC Student Center.

Campus

SJCC's campus is located in West San Jose, in the neighborhood of Fruitdale. It is bound by Bascom Ave to the west, Leigh Ave to the east, and Moorpark Ave to the north.

Notable buildings on campus include César E. Chávez Library, the Science Complex, the Student Center, Carmen Castellano Fine Arts Center, and the Technology Center, among others.

César E. Chávez Library
The new library opened in June 2003. It was named after Californian civil rights activist César E. Chávez. The library is state-of-the-art with wireless Internet access and data ports throughout the building.

The library also has an electronic research lab consisting of thirty personal computers, an electronic whiteboard and a variety of learning software.

The library collection consists of approximately 63,000 books and 200 periodical subscriptions.  In addition, the library’s databases make thousands of periodical articles available to students both on and off-campus.

Carmen Castellano Fine Arts Center
The Carmen Castellano Fine Arts Center was opened in 2012. It is named after longtime local arts booster and community organizer Carmen Castellano.

The center includes a fine arts gallery and a theatre/performance space, alongside classrooms for relevant departments.

KJCC
KJCC 104.1 FM is an online and very low power FM radio station run by San Jose City College students. KJCC began in 1978, then in fall 1994, radio classes were cancelled due to budget cuts, and has since been operated by campus clubs.

Athletics

San Jose City College is home to Jagsports.
A $1.7 million capital improvements plan includes a new weight and fitness training complex which is open now to all students, and contains weight and cardiovascular equipment.

During the 1970s, SJCC was a major training hub for Olympic track and field athletes.  Under the supervision of coach Bert Bonanno, Caitlyn Jenner (known as Bruce Jenner prior to her transition) trained eight hours per day at the track before he won the 1976 Olympic decathlon.  Alumni Millard Hampton and Andre Phillips both won Olympic gold medals, with coaching assistance from Bobby Poynter who was a part of San Jose State University's "Speed City" track team, and was also their coach and teacher at Silver Creek High School (California).  The throwing facilities, in particular, were home to gold medalist Mac Wilkins, Al Feuerbach and John Powell.  All three became world record holders, Wilkins and Feuerbach setting their records at San Jose City College.  Following Jenner's victory in Montreal, Bonanno created the Bruce Jenner Invitational, one of the top domestic meets for top-level athletes.  It was an annual televised stop, equivalent with today's Prefontaine Classic.  He also used Hampton and Phillips' names to create a local high school invitational.

In 1984 and 1987, the San Jose City College track was host to the USA Outdoor Track and Field Championships.

In February 2018, men's basketball head coach Percy Carr became the all-time winningest black head coach in college basketball history.

Notable people

Alumni
Amy Tan, National Book Award-winning author of The Joy Luck Club
Ato Boldon, Olympics gold-medalist
Bob Mead, member of the New Hampshire House of Representatives
Bob Toledo, head coach for the UCLA Bruins football 
Chris Cain, Blues Music Award-winning musician
Dave Laut, two time NCAA-champion athlete
Dave Righetti, All-Star player for the New York Yankees
Dave Stieb All-Star player for the Toronto Blue Jays
Diamara Planell, Olympic athlete
Erik Bakich, coach of the Michigan Wolverines
Johnpaul Jones, award-winning architect of the National Museum of the American Indian
Scott Erickson, 1991 World Series-champion baseball player
Sonia Sheridan, founder of Generative Systems
Marcos Pinedo, notable art dealer and collector 
Millard Hampton, Olympic silver-medalist

Faculty
Marie E. Johnson-Calloway, mixed-media artist
John Shrader, Professor of Journalism, has an extensive background in television and radio sports anchoring and sports reporting. For more than 15 years, John was a sports anchor/sports reporter/talk show host for KNBR Radio in San Francisco. He was a television sports anchor in San Jose for ten years, first at KNTV-TV and then KICU-TV. He also was the  San Jose Sharks intermission host and rink-side reporter for the 2006-07 season on FSN Bay Area.

References

External links

Official website
San Jose City College Times, college newspaper

 
California Community Colleges
Educational institutions established in 1921
Schools accredited by the Western Association of Schools and Colleges
1921 establishments in California
Two-year colleges in the United States
College radio stations in California